"35 MPH Town" is the 61st single by Toby Keith. Keith wrote it with longtime collaborator Bobby Pinson. It was released April 13, 2015 and is the second single from his album of the same name.

Content 
The song centers around the American small town society today, claiming "things ain't like they used to be round here." The narrator also brings to attention that children are becoming lazy instead of working and also the dangers of today, claiming "momma locked the door last night for the first time in all of her years" and "the streets ain't safe for a bike to ride down."

Release

In the first week, it sold 5,000 units and was the seventh most added song to country radio.

Reception

Taste of Country reviewed the song favorably and called it "a story that will stir up opinions."

Chart performance

The song debuted at No. 59 on Country Airplay.

References

2015 songs
2015 singles
Toby Keith songs
Show Dog-Universal Music singles
Songs written by Toby Keith
Songs written by Bobby Pinson